Bigg Boss OTT (or Bigg Boss: Over-The-Top) is a spin-off Indian Hindi-language reality digital series of the show Bigg Boss that airs exclusively on Viacom 18's streaming service platform Voot. The digital edition hosted by Karan Johar and the show premiered its first season on 8 August 2021.

Concept 
As with the television series, the group of contestants referred to as Housemates are enclosed in the Bigg Boss House under constant surveillance of cameras and microphones. The winner of Bigg Boss OTT will receive ₹25 lakh and the "OTT edition" trophy.

The show is a 24/7 non stop show and also it have 1 hour daily episode on Voot like the original edition.

Development
The spin-off edition was officially announced on 24 July 2021, Voot unveiled a poster with Karan Johar as the host of this digital exclusive season. On 3 August, Voot unveiled a third promo with Johar revealing the format of the season.

Broadcasts
There was no television coverage for this edition; instead, it would be completely streamed online at Voot for 24×7 coverage.

House
The location for the house set to remain at Film City, Mumbai like how it did for the original series. The house contains a living area, One large bedroom, kitchen, garden, bathroom, store room, smoking room and an underground jail (for punishment purposes only). The house also contains a confession room where contestants speak private matters to Bigg Boss.

Series Overview

Housemate pattern

Controversies

References

External links 
 Bigg Boss OTT on Voot

Bigg Boss (Hindi TV series)
Indian reality television series
2021 Indian television series debuts
Colors TV original programming